The Lanza government of Italy held office from 14 December 1869 until 10 July 1873, a total of 1,304 days, or 3 years, 6 months and 26 days. It is the second longest government in the history of the Kingdom of Italy, after the Mussolini Cabinet.

Government parties
The government was composed by the following parties:

Composition

References

Italian governments
1869 establishments in Italy